= Vršani, Tuzla =

Village in Bosnia and Herzegovina

Vršani
- Village
- Location within Bosnia and Herzegovina
- Coordinates: 44.5074785°N 18.6980359°E
- Country: Bosnia and Herzegovina
- Entity: Federation of Bosnia and Herzegovina
- Canton: Tuzla
- Municipality: Tuzla

Area
  - Total: 0.38 sq mi (0.98 km^{2})

Population (2013)
  - Total: 5
  - Density: 13/sq mi (5.1/km^{2})
- Time zone: UTC+1 (CET)
  - Summer (DST): UTC+2 (CEST)

Vršani is a village in the municipality of Tuzla, Tuzla Canton, Bosnia and Herzegovina.

== Demographics ==
According to the 2013 census, its population was 5.

Ethnicity in 2013
Ethnicity	Number	Percentage
Croats	4	80.0%
Bosniaks	1	20.0%
Total	5	100%
